Khalilli, Khalli, Khayli, Khalilly, Khalily or Xəlilli and Xalilli may refer to:

Khalilli, Kurdamir, Azerbaijan
Qubaxəlilli, Azerbaijan
Xəlilli, Agsu, Azerbaijan
Xəlilli, Davachi, Azerbaijan
Xəlilli, Ismailli, Azerbaijan
Xəlilli, Jalilabad, Azerbaijan
Xəlilli, Nakhchivan, Azerbaijan

See also
Khalili (disambiguation)